NEFA may refer to:

 NEFA (drug), an NMDA antagonist
 Nine Eleven Finding Answers Foundation (NEFA Foundation)
 New England Foundation for the Arts
 Non-esterified fatty acid; see 
 New England Freedom Association
 North-East Frontier Agency